The men's all-around dumbbell was a weightlifting event held as part of the Weightlifting at the 1904 Summer Olympics programme. Three athletes competed.

Medalists

Results

References

Sources
 

Weightlifting at the 1904 Summer Olympics
Combination events